Pozuelo de Calatrava is a municipality in Ciudad Real, Castile-La Mancha, Spain. It has a population of 2,602.

Notable person
José María Hugo de la Fuente Morales (1855–1932), entomologist

Municipalities in the Province of Ciudad Real